The 2012 Philippine Basketball Association (PBA) rookie draft was an event held at Robinson's Midtown Mall in Ermita, Manila on August 19, 2012 which allowed PBA teams to draft players from the amateur ranks.

Draft lottery
The lottery determined the team that will obtain the first pick on the draft. The remaining first-round picks and the second-round picks were assigned to teams in reverse order of their cumulative win–loss record in the previous season, with records from the Philippine Cup having heavier weight.

The lottery was held on July 22, 2012, during halftime of Game 1 of the 2012 PBA Governors Cup Finals at the Smart Araneta Coliseum in Quezon City. The Air21 Express won the rights to the first overall selection against the Alaska Aces, but due to a previous transaction, the draft rights of Air21 went to the Petron Blaze Boosters.

Draft

1st round

2nd round

3rd round
Note: This is the natural drafting order.

4th round

Note: Air21, Alaska, Petron Blaze, and Talk 'N Text passed in this round.

5th round

Note: Barako Bull, Meralco, Rain or Shine and B-Meg passed in this round.

6th round

Note: GlobalPort passed in this round.

Trades involving draft picks

Pre-draft trades
Note: All traded draft picks associated to GlobalPort previously belonged to the Powerade Tigers before selling their franchise to Sultan 900 Capital, Inc.
Prior to the day of the draft, the following trades were made and resulted in exchanges of draft picks between the teams.
  On May 14, 2011, Petron (as San Miguel) acquired two first round picks and a 2012 first round pick from Barako Bull (as Air21) in exchange for 2012 and 2013 first round picks. Previously, in a three-team trade, Barako Bull (as Burger King) acquired the 2012 pick and a 2010 first round pick on October 12, 2009, from Barako Energy Coffee in a three-team trade with Talk 'N Text.  The Barako Energy Coffee franchise was bought by the Lina Group of Companies in 2011 and was renamed as the Shopinas.com Clickers then later as the Air21 Express. The original Air21 Express however was renamed as the Barako Bull Energy in 2011 after the Lina Group acquired the majority share of the Energy Food and Drinks, a subsidiary of Photokina Marketing which owns the Barako Bull brand.
  On July 18, 2011, Barangay Ginebra acquired a 2012 first round pick and KG Canaleta from Barako Bull (as Air21) to in exchange for Willie Miller. Previously, the Express acquired the pick and a 2011 second round pick on August 29, 2010, from Powerade in exchange for Ren-Ren Ritualo, Sean Anthony and the draft rights to 18th pick Jai Reyes. 
 
  On May 29, 2012, Air21 acquired Eric Salamat and a second round pick from Alaska in exchange for RJ Jazul.
 
   On November 16, 2011, in a three-team trade, Barako Bull acquired Jimbo Aquino, a 2012 second round pick and a 2013 first round pick from Barangay Ginebra, B-Meg acquired a 2012 second round pick from the Energy Cola and Yancy de Ocampo from Ginebra, and Ginebra acquired Rico Maierhofer from the Llamados and Allein Maliksi from the Energy Cola.
  On September 22, 2010, in a three-team trade, Powerade acquired a 2012 second round pick and Rob Reyes from Barako Bull Energy Boosters, and a 2011 first round pick and a 2012 second round pick from Meralco; the Bolts acquired Asi Taulava from the Tigers; and the Boosters acquired Jason Misolas and Khasim Mirza from the Bolts and Ken Bono from the Boosters.
 
  On January 31, 2011, Barako Bull (as Air21) acquired a second round pick and a 2013 first round pick from Powerade in exchange for J.R. Quiñahan.
  On May 30, 2011, Alaska acquired a 2012 second round pick, a 2011 second round pick and Jay-R Reyes from Barako Bull (as Air21) in exchange for Joe Devance. Previously, Air21 acquired the 2012 pick from B-Meg from a previous transaction.

Draft-day trades
  The GlobalPort Batang Pier acquired the draft rights to 9th pick Vic Manuel and Val Acuña from B-Meg in exchange for Sean Anthony.
   The Barako Bull Energy acquired the draft rights to 12th pick Dave Marcelo and Sean Anthony (who was traded from GlobalPort earlier in the first round), in exchange for Barako Bull's draft rights for Aldrech Ramos.
  The Meralco Bolts acquired the draft rights to 17th pick Kelly Nabong from Rain or Shine in exchange for Meralco's 2015 second round pick.

Undrafted players

References

External links
PBA.ph

2012
Draft